Origin recognition complex subunit 3 is a protein that in humans is encoded by the ORC3 (ORC3L) gene.

Function 

The origin recognition complex (ORC) is a highly conserved six subunits protein complex essential for the initiation of the DNA replication in eukaryotic cells. Studies in yeast demonstrated that ORC binds specifically to origins of replication and serves as a platform for the assembly of additional initiation factors such as Cdc6 and Mcm proteins. The protein encoded by this gene is a subunit of the ORC complex. Studies of a similar gene in Drosophila suggested a possible role of this protein in neuronal proliferation and olfactory memory. Alternatively spliced transcript variants encoding distinct isoforms have been reported for this gene.

Interactions 

ORC3 has been shown to interact with:

 MCM4, 
 MCM7, 
 ORC2, 
 ORC4, 
 ORC5,  and
 ORC6.

References

Further reading